Woodside is a historic home located near Delaplane, Fauquier County, Virginia.  The oldest section was built about 1800, and is located in the rear.  It is of hewn log construction (possibly chestnut), clad with a brick veneer in the mid-20th century and connected to the main house by a hyphen.  The main house was built in 1848, and is a two-story, three bay, brick structure in a vernacular Greek Revival style.  Also on the property are the contributing log kitchen and a log smokehouse, both built about 1800.

It was listed on the National Register of Historic Places in 2009.

References

Houses on the National Register of Historic Places in Virginia
Federal architecture in Virginia
Houses completed in 1800
Houses in Fauquier County, Virginia
National Register of Historic Places in Fauquier County, Virginia